HD 89744 is a star in the northern circumpolar constellation of Ursa Major, positioned about 0.4° due south of the bright star Tania Australis (μ UMa). This object has a yellow-white hue and is dimly visible to the naked eye with an apparent visual magnitude of 5.73. The distance to this star has been measured using the patallax method, which locates it 126 light years from the Sun. It is drifting closer with a radial velocity of −4.4 km/s. There are two known exoplanets orbiting this star.

At various times the star HD 89744 has been assigned a stellar classification of F7V, F7IV-V, and F8IV, suggesting it is an F-type main-sequence star that is evolving onto the subgiant branch. It is ~8.4 billion years old with an inactive chromosphere and is spinning with a projected rotational velocity of 9.3 km/s. The star is 2.16 times the size of the Sun with 1.4 times the Sun's radius. It is a high metallicity star, showing a greater abundance of heavier elements than in the Sun. The star is radiating 6.4 times the luminosity of the Sun from its photosphere at an effective temperature of 6,381 K.

Planetary system
In April 2000, a planet was discovered using radial velocity measurements taken at Fred Lawrence Whipple Observatory and Lick Observatory. The orbital parameters were updated in 2006 and 2007 using additional measurements. A second planet with a much longer period was discovered in 2019.

See also
 List of extrasolar planets

References

F-type subgiants
Brown dwarfs
Planetary systems with two confirmed planets

Ursa Major (constellation)
Durchmusterung objects
9326
089744
050786
4067